Blacklick Woods Metro Park is a metropolitan park in Reynoldsburg, Ohio, owned and operated by Columbus and Franklin County Metro Parks. The park was established in 1948, the first park in the Metro Park system. It was named a National Natural Landmark in 1974.

Attributes and history
Opened in 1948, and located in Reynoldsburg, this  park is the oldest park in the system. Within the forested area of the park is the Walter A. Tucker State Nature Preserve preserving one of the oldest Beech-maple forest in central Ohio. In the southern area of the preserve you can find an assortment of white and pin oak, white ash with specimens of red maple, red elm, shagbark and bitternut hickory, hophornbeam, American hornbeam and dogwood. There are also wetlands and seasonable ponds in the southern area of the nature preserve where salamanders, chorus frogs, and wood ducks among other aquatic life and amphibians can be found. Fox, Rabbits, and White-Tailed Deer can also be seen throughout the park. It is also well known as a good spot for bird watching. The Golf Course has been certified by Audubon International as a Cooperative Sanctuary. The Blacklick Woods Nature Center with Naturalists and volunteers is also available to answer questions. Blacklick Creek flows south along the eastern boundary of the park and is accessible by several trails that travel through a variety of fields, meadows, and forests.

In 1974, Blacklick Woods was designated as a National Natural Landmark by the National Park Service.

See also
 List of National Natural Landmarks in Ohio

References

External links

 

Parks in Ohio
1948 establishments in Ohio
Parks established in 1948
Protected areas of Franklin County, Ohio
Protected areas of Fairfield County, Ohio
National Natural Landmarks in Ohio
Nature centers in Ohio
Golf clubs and courses in Ohio